The Chimbu–Wahgi languages are a language family sometimes included in the Trans–New Guinea proposal.

Languages
There is little doubt that the Chimbu–Wahgi family is valid. The languages are:

Chimbu–Wahgi family
Chimbu (Simbu) branch
Kuman (Chimbu), Chuave, Nomane, Golin–Dom, Salt-Yui, Sinasina
Western Highlands
Jimi River
 Maring, Narak–Kandawo
Wahgi Valley
 Nii, Wahgi, North Wahgi (= Yu We?)
Mount Hagen
Melpa (Medlpa)
Kaugel River: Imbo Ungu, Umbu-Ungu, Mbo-Ung (Bo-Ung)

Phonology
Several of the Chimbu–Wahgi languages have uncommon lateral consonants: see Nii, Wahgi, and Kuman for examples.

Chimbu–Wahgi languages have contrastive tone.

Pronouns
The singular pronouns are:

{|
! !!sg
|-
!1
|*ná
|-
!2
|*nim
|-
!3
|*[y]é
|}

Dual *-l and plural *-n reflect Trans–New Guinea forms.

Evolution

Middle Wahgi reflexes of proto-Trans-New Guinea (pTNG) etyma:

ama ‘mother’ < *am(a,i)
amu ‘breast’ < *amu
numan ‘louse’ < *niman
numan ‘thought, mind, will’ < *n(o,u)
man, muŋ ‘fruit, nut, lump’
muŋgum ‘kidney’ < *maŋgV ‘round object’
mundmuŋ ‘heart’ < *mundun-maŋgV
mokum, mokem ‘knuckle, joint’ < *mo(k,ŋg)Vm ‘joint’
mundun mo- ‘be pot bellied’ < *mundun ‘internal organs, belly’
ŋaŋ ‘small male child’ < *ŋaŋ[a] ‘baby’
apa- ‘maternal uncle’ < *apa ‘father’
embe(m) ‘name’ < *imbi ‘name’
muk ‘blue’ < *muk
tuk- ‘chop’ < *tVk- ‘cut, cut off’
no- ‘eat’ < *na-
mek si- ‘to vomit’
mek ‘vomitus’ < *makV[C] + t(e,i)- ‘to vomit’

References

Further reading 

 
Ross, Malcolm. 2014. Proto-Chimbu-Wahgi. TransNewGuinea.org.

External links 
 Kaipuleohone archive of Chimbu-Wahgi language recordings

 
Languages of Papua New Guinea
Papuan languages
Language families
Northeast New Guinea languages